Jetta (minor planet designation: 544 Jetta) is a minor planet orbiting the Sun. It is estimated to be 24 km in diameter.

References 

 (544) Jetta observations

External links
 
 

Background asteroids
Jetta
19040911
Jetta